Belovka is a rural locality (a selo) in Bolsheprivalovskoye Rural Settlement, Verkhnekhavsky District, Voronezh Oblast, Russia. The population was 154 as of 2010. There are 3 streets.

Geography 
Belovka is located 19 km northwest of Verkhnyaya Khava (the district's administrative centre) by road. Bolshaya Privalovka is the nearest rural locality.

References 

Rural localities in Verkhnekhavsky District